Stop is an unincorporated community located in Wayne County, Kentucky, United States.

The origin of the name "Stop" is obscure.

References

Unincorporated communities in Wayne County, Kentucky
Unincorporated communities in Kentucky